Sunitha is an Indian playback singer and voice actor who primarily works in Telugu films. She is a recipient of nine Nandi Awards and two Filmfare Awards South in various categories. She also received a National Award from All India Radio under light music category when she was 15 years old. She received her first Nandi award in the year 1999 and bagged Nandi Awards in a row for the years 2002 to 2006 and again for the years 2010 to 2012. She was also honored with Lata Mangeshkar Best Singer Award for 2011 by the Government of Andhra Pradesh. In the year 2019, Sunitha was honored with New Jersey state recognition award by the Senate and General assembly of the state of New Jersey passing a resolution to salute her excellence and contributions to the world of music and Indian Cinema, a rare felicitation given to an Indian artist by the state of New Jersey.

Sunitha's commercial singing career began in the year 1995 with the movie Gulabi and has established herself as a leading playback singer of Telugu Film Industry with her mellifluous voice. She is also known as an anchor and host for music based programs and flagship programs, one among them was anchoring the historical Amaravati foundation-laying ceremony in the year 2015. Sunitha is also associated as a judge to musical reality shows in various channels, one among them is Padutha Theeyaga, an Iconic musical show that has been enthralling fans and music lovers for the last two decades on ETV which was launched and hosted by the Legend S. P. Balasubrahmanyam. Her contributions are widely noted as a voice-over artist giving voice to over 110 actresses in more than 750 films.

Sunitha traveled extensively across 19 foreign countries offering her exclusive live performances across the world as an artist. Countries include USA (almost every year since 1999), UK, UAE, Singapore, Malaysia, Uganda, Nigeria, Tanzania, South Africa, Australia, Scotland, Ireland, Sri Lanka, Thailand, Japan, Oman, Bahrain, Qatar, Mauritius.

Early and personal life
Sunitha was born on 10 May 1978 in Vijayawada, Andhra Pradesh. At the age of 6, she got training in music from Shri Pemmaraju Surya Rao in Carnatic Vocal and Light music from Kalaga Krishna Mohan. At a very early age, she got many opportunities to participate and perform in several concerts, including programs featured by All India Radio. At the age of 13, she also participated in Tyagaraja Aradhana Utsavalu along with her Guru Pemaraju Surya Rao. She received numerous awards and appreciations in various competitions for her performances as a child prodigy, one of the special mentions is her scholarship from Central Government to pursue her musical trainings.

She belongs to a music-loving family and her parents are fond of music. She got married at the age of 19 to Kiran Kumar Goparaju who works in the media and they later got divorced. The couple has two children Akash and Shreya. Shreya sang her debut song, "Tick... Tick... Tick..." in Telugu movie Savyasachi.

In January 2021, Sunitha married a businessman Rama Krishna Veerapaneni in the presence of her family members and close friends.

Career

Playback singing 

Sunitha has begun her singing career as a playback singer in films at an age of 17. Sashi Preetham, a music director first gave her a chance to sing in her debut film Gulabi and her debut song is "Ee Vela Lo Neevu" written by Sirivennela Seetharama Sastry. She sang a single card for the Kannada film Bhoomi Geetha in 1997, music composed by Ilayaraja. Apart from that she also sang Telugu TV serial title songs such as Ruturagalu and Antarangalu. She received her first Nandi Award from the combined state of Andhra Pradesh for singing title song of Antharangalu in 1999.

She has worked under the supervision of music directors like Ilayaraja, Vidyasagar, M.M. Keeravani, A.R Rahman, S.V. Krishna Reddy, Koti, Raj, Vandematharam Srinivas, Mani Sharma, Ramana Gogula, S.A. Raj Kumar, Sandeep Choutha, Mickey J. Mayer, Devisri Prasad, R.P. Patnaik, Chakri, Nihal, Kalyani Malik, Anup Rubens, Sunil Kashyap, Saluri Vasu Rao, Madhavapeddi Suresh, Saketha Sairam, Bunty, V. Harikrishna, Jassie Gift, S. Thaman, etc. She rendered nearly 3000 songs in many south Indian films. She has sung in Telugu, Tamil, and Kannada.

Voice acting 
Sunitha stepped in to the world of dubbing quite unwillingly and eventually her ease at voice modulations made her the most sought dubbing artist for all the lead heroines ever after release of the movie Choodalani Undi in the year 1998 starring Mega star Chiranjeevi and Soundarya, in which she gave her voice to Soundarya. She achieved a very rare feat as a voice-over artist in Telugu film industry with a record breaking contribution of lending voice to 110+ actresses spread across 750+ films. She also holds a record of giving her voice for 60 movies in a single year. Gautamiputra Satakarni is her 750th movie as a dubbing artist in which she gave her voice to Shriya Saran. Her top 10 movies as a voice-over artist include Choodalani Vundi, Ninne Premista, Nuvvu Vastavani, Shankar Dada MBBS, Manmadhudu, Sri Ramadasu, Nenunnanu, Anand, Godavari, Jayam.

Devotional Singing 
Sunitha Upadrasta's contributions towards devotional singing takes its uniqueness in offering Carnatic music based bhajans, kirtans and songs with expression.

Annamayya Paataku Pattabhishekam 

Annamayya Paataku Pattabhishekam is a mega in-house prestigious program taken up by Tirumala Tirupati Devasthanams in the year 2016 as a musical tribute to the saint-poet Tallapaka Annamacharya. Singer Sunitha is the Anchor for this culturally unique show ever since the conception of this program. The program gave life to over 1000 rare sankeerthanas out of 32,000 sankeertanas penned by Annamayya on God Venkateswara. Sunitha by herself rendered 140 sankeerthanas so far, offering them as her floral offerings to lord Venkateswara along with the title song for this prestigious program series.

Vengamaamba Keerthanalu 
Tarigonda Vengamamba was a poet and staunch devotee of Lord Venkateswara in the 18th century. TTD took up "Vengamaamba Keerthanalu" as one of its prestigious projects to compose and offer the rare works of Vengamaamba to the world of music and literature. Sunitha was part of this prestigious project taken up by Sri  Venkateswara Recording Project, which was established by TTD to group all its activities relating to recording. Apart from these compositions recorded by SVRP-TTD, Sunitha also rendered 7 keerthanas in the movie "Vengamaamba" directed by P. Udaya Bhaskar and music given by M.M. Keeravani.

Naada Neerajanam, Tirumala Brahmotsavam 
"Naada neerajanam" is an oblation to lord in the form of performing one's own art form from Tirumala Graded artists. Artists from all over the world are invited to perform in Nadaneerajanam. "Brahmotsavam" is the most important annual fête celebrated at Sri Venkateswara Temple in Tirumala. Sunitha Upadrasta was blessed to perform quiet a few times on the divine stage Nada Neeraajanam, as well while performing unjal(swing) seva and one other divine experiences of singing for the lord during Brahmotsavam on the streets(Madaveedulu) surrounding the temple. She also anchored one of the rare new year celebrations in Tirumala chanting "govinda naama" on the eve of 31 December.

Srivaari Sevalu 
Sunitha Upadrasta offered her vocals to Srivaari sevalu program presented by SVBC for two of the weekly seva's and Srivaari sevalu samaahaaram song that goes with the lyrics "Enni janmala punyamo neekinni sevalu cheyagaa".

Thyaagaraaja Utsavaalu 
Tyagaraja Aradhana is the annual festival glorifying Telugu saint composer Tyagaraja. The festival is observed in the states of Andhra Pradesh and Tamil Nadu, primarily in Tiruvaiyaru, the place where Tyagaraja attained Samadhi. Sunitha, at her very young age of 10 years, participated in Tyagaraja Aradhana Utsavalu along with her guru Sri Pemmaraju Surya Rao.

Prashanthi Nilayam 
Prasanthi Nilayam, literally "The Abode of Supreme Peace", is the birthplace and the headquarter of the sacred mission of Bhagawan Sri Sathya Sai Baba. Sunitha presented devotional songs in the presence of Bhagawan on two different occasions, On 15 August 2008 and 19 November 2008.

Discography

Telugu
Selective works of singer Sunitha as a playback singer listed below

Kannada

Tamil

Other

Non film songs
Sunitha sang Television film title songs for various serials and she also lent her voice as a dubbing artist for the TV film series Andam.

Private albums 

Sunitha was part of numerous private album recordings. Meera padavali and Aanota – Manasu palike vela are her two most known works composed by her Guru Kalaga Krishna Mohan. She also featured in the private album Sri Ramachandra Krupalu, a bhajan by Tulsi Das and produced by sunithanmusic.com.

Chandrashekara Ashtakam also takes a special mention for which music is composed by Sai Madhukar.

Few other private albums to mention are Raghuram, Sai Sudha, Sri Venkateswara Thatwanidhi, Sri Vallabha Bhakthi Geethalu, Sai Darshanam, Sri Chidvilasam, Amma durgamma, Pahimaam, Sri Rama Charanam, Govinda Ganamrutham, Saye Dhaivam, Bathuku Paata.

Performances 
Sunitha traveled extensively across 19 foreign countries offering her exclusive live performances across the world as an artist. Countries include USA (almost every year since 1999), UK, UAE, Singapore, Malaysia, Uganda, Nigeria, Tanzania, South Africa, Australia, Scotland, Ireland, SriLanka, Thailand, Japan, Oman,

Bahrain, Qatar, Mauritius. In 2009, she started her Melodious Moments with Sunitha musical journey which in 2019 was organized in 5 major USA cities San Jose, Charlotte, Cleveland, Indianapolis and Los Angeles. The event in Indianapolis witnessed its performance in the iconic Old National Center. Celebrating this success, Melodious Moments with Sunitha unveiled its first live show in Hyderabad on 4 August 2019 in Shilpakala vedika which then extended to various cities and towns in Telugu states.

Her other noted performances include groundbreaking ceremony for Amaravathi - new capital of Andhra Pradesh, 200 years of Secunderabad celebrations by the state Government, hosting 50 years celebrations in the state Assembly, singing Vande Mataram along with S.P.Balasubrahmanyam at the Congress Plenary Meet during 50 years of Indian Independence,

Filmography

As Voice actor

TV shows 
Sunitha anchored, hosted and performed as a singer in many music-based programs and live shows in most of the reputed Telugu television channels. She has given about 500 programs so far on AIR, DD channel, ETV, Gemini TV, and MAA TV

Short films 

Sunitha played the lead role in her first short film Raagam. The short film was also nominated for SIIMA, 2017 in short film category.

Awards

Nandi Awards
 Nandi Award for Best Female Playback Singer for TV film Antha Rangaalu (1999)
 Nandi Award for Best Female Dubbing Artist for the movie Jayam (2002)
 Nandi Award for Best Female Playback Singer for the Movie Athade Oka Sainyam (2003)
 Nandi Award for Best Female Dubbing Artist for the movie Anand (voice of the Kamalinee Mukherjee) (2004)
 Nandi Award for Best Female Dubbing Artist for the movie Pothe Poni (2005)
 Nandi Award for Best Female Playback Singer for the movie Godavari (2006)
 Nandi Award for Best Female Playback Singer for TV film Anthahpuram (2010)
 Nandi Award for a TV film called Mamathala Kovela (2011)
 Nandi Award for Best Female Dubbing Artist for the movie Sri Rama Rajyam (voice of the Nayantara) (2012)

Filmfare Awards
 Filmfare Award for Best Female Playback Singer - Kannada (2010) for the movie Cheluveye Ninne Nodalu for the song "O Priyathama"
 Filmfare Award for Best Female Playback Singer - Telugu (2014) for the movie Oohalu Gusagusalade for the song "Em Sandehamledu"
 Nominated-Filmfare Award for Best Female Playback Singer - Telugu (2009) for the movie Pravarakhyudu for the song "Neela Neela Mabbulu"
 Nominated-Filmfare Award for Best Female Playback Singer - Telugu (2010) for the movie Vedam for the song "Egiripothe"
 Nominated-Filmfare Award for Best Female Playback Singer - Kannada (2010) for the movie Modalasala for the song "Prathama"

Other Awards 

 Vamsi Berkeley Award as Best female playback singer in year 1999
 Vaartha Vasavi Award as a best playback singer (2000)
 Bharata Muni Award (2000)
 Cine Goers Award for Best Dubbing (2002)
 Dasari Award as a best playback singer (2003)
 Best Playback Singer award from European Telugu Association, London (2003)
 Kalavedika Art Award as an All-rounder for excellent performance as a Singer, Anchor and Movie dubbing artist (2003)
 Sangam P Susheela Youth Award honoured with Gold Medal (2004)
 Sangam P Susheelawa Youth Award for year 2004 honoured with Gold Medal
 Vamsi Berkeley Award as Best female playback singer in year 2005
 Kala Sudha Award in 2006 (Ugadi Puraskar)
 'Best female play back singer of tollywood 2010' award for the song "Hrudaya Vedana" from the film "Aa Intlo" music scored by sri Koti. This award was given by "Radio Mirchi" in a grand function held at Chennai on Saturday 17 July 2010
 TV Award 2009 for Best Female Playback Singer presented by Delhi Telugu Academy in Hyderabad on 8 August 2010
 Big FM Best Singer Award for 'Egiripothe' song from Vedam Movie in 2010
 Big FM Kannada Award for Big Most Entertaining Singer
 TSR - TV9 Award for Best playback singer - female (2010) was presented on 10 April 2011 in Hyderabad
 Ghantasala Melody Queen Award in 2011
 Lata Mangeshkar Best Singer Award for 2011 was presented by the State Government at 2nd
 Maa Tea Award for Mamathala Kovela in 2012
 T. Subbarami Reddy Lalitha Sangeeta Puraskar in 2013
 Sangeet Samman 2013 (Kannada film)
 Best play back singer award for the song "Em Sandeham ledu" from the movie "Oohalu gusagusalade" by Radio Mirchi music awards in 2014
 TSR TV9 Best play back singer award for the song "Em Sandeham ledu" in 2014
 NTR memorial award 2015
 Singer of the decade award in the year 2016 by Zee Apsara Awards
 Prestigious Indywood Academy award as best playback singer for the song "Chivaraku migiledhi" from the epic biopic Mahanati in 2018
 New Jersey state recognition award by the Senate and General assembly of the state of New Jersey passing a resolution to salute her excellence and contributions to the world of music and Indian Cinema in 2019
 Vishishta seva puraskar by "I Stand for the Nation" NGO in 2019
 Radio Mirchi Excellence award in the field of singing at Mirchi Music awards in 2020
 Felicitation by Kala Darbar, Amaravathi for completing 25 years in film industry in the year 2020

References

External links
 
 
 

Living people
Indian women playback singers
Indian voice actresses
Filmfare Awards South winners
Kannada playback singers
Singers from Andhra Pradesh
Telugu playback singers
Nandi Award winners
1968 births
20th-century Indian actresses
Actresses from Andhra Pradesh
20th-century Indian singers
20th-century Indian women singers
21st-century Indian singers
21st-century Indian women singers
21st-century Indian actresses
Women musicians from Andhra Pradesh
Musicians from Andhra Pradesh
People from Andhra Pradesh
People from Guntur district
People from Guntur
Film people from Andhra Pradesh
Indian playback singers